The big things of Australia are large structures, some of which are novelty architecture and some are sculptures. There are estimated to be over 230 such objects around the country. There are big things in every state and territory in continental Australia.

Most big things began as tourist traps found along major roads between destinations.

The big things have become something of a cult phenomenon, and are sometimes used as an excuse for a road trip, where many or all big things are visited and used as a backdrop to a group photograph. Many of the big things are considered works of folk art and have been heritage-listed, though others have come under threat of demolition.

List of big things (by state or territory)

Australian Capital Territory

New South Wales

Northern Territory

Queensland

South Australia

Tasmania

Victoria

Western Australia

In popular culture

The London production of Priscilla, Queen of the Desert: the Musical references the Big Prawn, Big Merino, Big Pineapple and the Big Banana.
 The ABC produced a documentary titled Big Things as part of its program The Big Picture.
 The National Museum in Canberra has a comprehensive multimedia exhibit displaying many big things.
 In 2007 Australia Post issued a set of 50c postage stamps by Reg Mombassa, commemorating five of the most iconic big things:
 The Big Banana at Coffs Harbour (NSW)
 The Big Golden Guitar at Tamworth (NSW)
 The Big Lobster at Kingston SE (SA)
 The Big Merino at Goulburn (NSW)
 The Big Pineapple at Nambour (QLD)
 Danny Wallace mentions Australia's big things in his book Yes Man.
 Travel writer Bill Bryson details his visit to the Big Lobster and the Big Bull in his book Down Under / In a Sunburned Country
 In the Australian comedy film Young Einstein, when the titular character books into a hotel, the desk clerk asks if he's "Here to see the Big Bed?"
 English stand-up comedian Ross Noble visited many of Australia's big things during his 2009 tour Ross Noble's Australian Trip.
 Australian comedians The Listies categorise Australia's big things in their comedy dictionary, Ickypedia as "Enbigenating".
 The Big Pineapple appears in TY the Tasmanian Tiger 2: Bush Rescue.

See also
 Dunedoo, New South Wales, which decided against "The Big Dunny"
 List of world's largest roadside attractions
 New Zealand's big things
 Novelty architecture

References

General references

 Scutt, Craig. The Little Book of Big Aussie Icons. Five Mile Press. .
 Clarke, Amy (2017). "Australia's 'Big' problem – what to do with our ageing super-sized statues?" The Conversation (Australia). 19 September 2017.
 Clarke, Amy (2017). "Australia's Big Dilemma: Regional/National Identities, Heritage Listing and Big Things." Quotation: Proceedings of the 34th Annual Conference of the Society of Architectural Historians, Australia and New Zealand, edited by Gervork Hartoonian and John Ting, p. 46–56. University of Canberra. .

Specific references and notes

External links

Big Things of Australia, Postie Notes.
Map of big things
BIGThing_Whisperers Guide to BIG Things and Roadside Attractions
Big Things of Australia

 
Novelty buildings in Australia
Outdoor sculptures in Australia
Roadside attractions
Big
Lists of public art in Australia